Grait International College (GIC) is a privately owned school located in Sango Otta, Ogun State, South West, Nigeria. the school was established in the year 1995. GIC is for both boys and girls, day and boarding.

References

Secondary schools in Ogun State
Educational institutions established in 1995
1995 establishments in Nigeria